13-Methyltetradecanoic acid (13-MTD) is a fatty acid known to induce apoptosis or “programmed cell death” of certain human cancer cells. 13-MTD was originally purified from a soy fermentation product and can be chemically synthesized; however, the synthesized form contains the same biological property of its natural form.

Background

Decades ago, Pentagenic Pharmaceuticals (Diamond Bar, CA) engineered a soy fermentation product named Yang Zhen Hua 851 through a process of bacterial fermentation. Beginning in 1985, thousands of cancer patients have accepted Yang Zhen Hua 851 as an alternative to traditional chemotherapy and experienced improvements in their health and clinical conditions. Once exclusive to China, the soy fermentation product is now used in the United States.

More recently, research has indicated that the component most likely responsible for the anticancer agency in Yang Zhen Hua 851 is 13-Methyltetradecanoic acid. The fatty chain acid is most abundant in Yang Zhen Hua 851 and responds aggressively towards tumor cells through apoptosis. (Essentially, apoptosis is a process of cell death initiated by the presence or absence of certain stimuli.) Thus 13-MTD has become of great interest to the scientific community, and research has been conducted in an effort to understand how 13-MTD  induces apoptosis on a molecular level; moreover, the medical implications of 13-MTD as an alternative to drug chemotherapy are currently being considered.

Recent discoveries

To understand how 13-MTD actually induces apoptosis, researchers studied the fatty chain acid's anticancer activity on tumor cells developing in T Cell Lymphomas. The tests were conducted in vitro (in the lab) and in vivo (in body). The results showed that 13-MTD inhibits tumor cell growth by “down-regulating” p-AKT. AKT is a serine–threonine kinase that regulates cell survival. However, AKT's regulation of cells becomes dysfunctional as cancerous cells develop. Essentially, cancerous cells attack the AKT and manage to switch and keep AKT's signals “on,” resulting in cell dysfunction. 13-MTD helps down-regulate AKT, allowing stability in cells and inducing programmed cell death to the tumor cells.

Bladder cells

In a related study, researchers investigated 13-MTD's anticancer activity in bladder cells. The results indicated that 13-MTD inhibits the growth of human bladder cancer cells through “mitochondrial-mediated” apoptosis. Moreover, data indicated that apoptosis was achieved by 13-MTD regulating the AKT and MAPK pathways. (The MAPK pathway is a chain of cell proteins that transfer information from the cell's surface, through a receptor, to the cell's DNA.) 13-MTD brings stability to the cell by down-regulating signals that the cell receives and sends, and also by activating necessary agents to combat cancer cells. For these reasons, 13-MTD has been considered a possible chemotherapeutic supplement.

Medical implications

The results from the scores of studies conducted on 13-MTD indicate that 13-MTD can be a possible chemotherapeutic supplement. The fatty chain acid's ability to resist and inhibit cancerous cells through apoptosis is impressive; however, what separates 13-MTD from chemical drugs and other fatty acids is the lack of toxicity levels and minimal side effects presented.

Published work documents the treatment of both rats and humans with 13-MTD throughout a 42-day period. The researchers studied adipose (body fat) tissue turnover and noted that 13-MTD did not harm participants. Furthermore, since 13-MTD is not produced in the human body like other fatty chain acids, its effectiveness does not depend on the body's environmental state or stress levels. Being a foreign agent, 13-MTD works effectively against a host of cancerous mutations in the body, whereas other fatty acids fail.

The research gathered on 13-MTD and the benefits it provides have helped introduce the fatty chain acid to the scientific community as a possible chemotherapeutic agent against cancer. Considering 13-MTD's effective apoptosis of certain human cancer cells and the low toxicity levels it presents, the medical implications of 13-MTD will continue to be studied and developed.

References

Fatty acids
Alkanoic acids